Hurricane Boris was the second of three storms to impact the Pacific coast of Mexico in June and July 1996. The storm gradually intensified, becoming a tropical storm the following day and then hurricane on June 29. As the storm neared landfall, an eye developed and Boris reached its peak intensity with winds of 90 mph (150 km/h). Shortly after, the hurricane made landfall along the south coast of Mexico, between Lazaro Cardenas and Acapulco, at this intensity. Boris quickly weakened following its landfall, becoming a tropical depression roughly 18 hours later. The remnants of the system persisted until July 1, at which time it dissipated just offshore the Mexican coastline. Boris caused heavy flooding in southern Mexico that resulted in ten fatalities; however, a damage estimate is unknown.

Meteorological history

Hurricane Boris originated from a tropical wave that moved off the west coast of Africa on June 8. The poorly organized wave tracked westward across the Atlantic Ocean and Caribbean Sea and entered the Pacific Ocean on June 23. The system gained enough circulation definition and rainbands to acquire tropical depression status on June 27.

Upon becoming a tropical cyclone, the Aviation forecast model predicted Tropical Depression Four-E to make landfall in Mexico as a weak tropical storm in 12 hours. Around that time, the forecast track was issued by the National Hurricane Center late on June 27, stating that it would receive an outflow near Hurricane Alma. At the same time, the UKMET model had Tropical Depression Four-E remaining offshore Mexico. The same model also had the depression becoming Tropical Storm Boris. In the same advisory, it was noted that the outer rain bands of Tropical Depression Four-E had moved onshore Mexico.

The center crossed the south coast of Mexico midway between Lazaro Cardenas and Acapulco. Shortly after landfall, Boris weakened to a depression and turned southwestward in response to a building subtropical ridge to its north. The system, thoroughly disrupted by the mountainous terrain of Mexico, dissipated on the July 1 after moving back over water just south of Puerta Vallarta.

Preparations, impact and aftermath
As Hurricane Boris was approaching Mexico, a tropical storm watch was issued for the coast between Manzanillo and Puerto Escondido on June 28. From Manzanillo to Puerto Maldonado, the tropical storm replaced with a hurricane warning the same day.

Boris caused ten deaths. One person was killed in Tecpan. Nearby, three other people drowned and five fishers were missing. In Acapulco, a child was killed when a roof collapsed. Also, in Acapulco, strong surf pushed fishing boats against a sea wall. Trees were downed, and business signs were blown down. Streets were flooded to the level of the tires. Trees were knocked down .

A total of about 10,000 people were left homeless, and at least 70 people were injured. Damage is unknown. Rain was heavy throughout the impacted region, with the highest totals in Guerrero. Those rains caused a flood on the San Jeronimo River, which left at least 5000 homeless. In Tecpan, a countless number of homes were washed away. The storm flooded lobbies of hotels along the coast. Approximately 12 boats were sunk offshore. Tecpan bore the brunt of the storm, reporting heavy damage. The area was impacted by Hurricane Alma just  a few days before. On July 18 the President of Mexico had a meeting for the victims of Boris and Cristina, a storm later that season, in Acapulco, Mexico.

See also
Other tropical cyclones named Boris
Hurricane Cosme (1989)
Hurricane Max (2017)

References

Boris (1996)
Boris (1996)
Boris (1996)